The Canton of Puiseaux is a former canton of the Loiret département, in the Centre région, in France. Since 1800 it has been a part of the Arrondissement of Pithiviers. Between 1926 and 1942 it was part of the Arrondissement of Montargis. It was disbanded following the French canton reorganisation which came into effect in March 2015. It consisted of 13 communes, which joined the canton of Le Malesherbois in 2015.

Communes
The canton of Puiseaux contained the following 13 communes and had 7,061 inhabitants (2012).

Augerville-la-Rivière
Aulnay-la-Rivière
Boësses 
Briarres-sur-Essonne
Bromeilles
Desmonts
Dimancheville
Échilleuses
Grangermont
La Neuville-sur-Essonne
Ondreville-sur-Essonne 
Orville
Puiseaux

References

Puiseaux
2015 disestablishments in France
States and territories disestablished in 2015